Edward Judd (4 October 1932 – 24 February 2009) was a British actor.

Biography
Born in Shanghai, he and his English father and Russian mother fled when the Japanese attacked China five years later. His career was at its peak in the 1960s, with a series of leading roles in British science fiction films, including The Day the Earth Caught Fire (1961 – a disaster film in which he played an alcoholic reporter during a time when two large nuclear explosions altered the Earth's axis, propelling the Earth towards the sun), First Men in the Moon (1964), and Island of Terror (1966). As well as starring in these films, he worked as a soap opera actor and performed other character parts on television. His roles in these science fiction films were highly praised by audiences and critics alike. Judd was also known for the 1975 "Think Once, Think Twice, Think Bike" campaign to make motorists aware of the risks faced on the road by motorcyclists.

Judd's success in The Day the Earth Caught Fire saw Columbia Pictures sign him to a long term contract. However, according to Val Guest, "he was such a pain in the ass to everybody. He had an enormous opinion of himself and he was his own worst enemy. Columbia just loaned him out here and there and then let him go."

Judd appeared regularly on TV. In particular, he played the tyrannical uncle, William Russell, in the 1979 TV mini-series Flambards. He also appeared in Thriller (1975), The Sweeney and The Onedin Line in supporting roles. Very little is known of his life after the 1970s. He was heard in an episode of the BBC Radio comedy Drop Me Here, Darling, starring Leslie Phillips, in 1983, as well as playing Barrymore in a televised version of The Hound of the Baskervilles the same year, and the BBC Radio play Philadelphia Moonshine in 1985. He appeared in the 1988 TV film Jack the Ripper as Thomas Arnold.

In the early 1970s, he lived in Cottenham Park Road, Wimbledon. During the 1970s and 1980s, Judd (known as Eddie to some friends, as evidenced in Michael Caine's 2011 autobiography) was a highly respected voice-over artist, used on many commercials recorded in the recording studios in London's Soho.

In the early 90s he lived in the Phoenix Hotel in Wimbledon and was a credit officer for a Canadian investment bank. He lived at a retirement home in Mitcham in his last years.

Personal life
He was married twice; his first wife, who had also appeared in The Day the Earth Caught Fire, was actress Gene Anderson, who died suddenly aged 34 from a cerebral hemorrhage whilst filming Z Cars: The Share Out in May 1965. His second wife was actress Norma Ronald, with whom he had two daughters.

Selected filmography

 The Guinea Pig (1948, uncredited) 
 The Small Voice (1948) 
 Once a Jolly Swagman (1949, uncredited)
 The Large Rope (1953, uncredited)
 Adventure in the Hopfields (1954), - Bill (uncredited)
 The Good Die Young (1954, - Simpson, Young Boxer (uncredited)
 X the Unknown (1956) - 2nd Soldier (uncredited)
 The Long Haul (1957) - Trucker
 Carry On Sergeant (1958) - Fifth Storesman
 The Man Upstairs (1958) - P.C. Stevens
 I Was Monty's Double (1958) - Another Soldier
 Subway in the Sky (1959) - Molloy
 No Safety Ahead (1959, uncredited)
 The Shakedown (1960) - Bernie (Barber)
 Sink the Bismarck! (1960) - Navigating Officer on 'Prince of Wales' (uncredited)
 The Challenge (1960) - Detective Sergeant Gittens
 The Criminal (1960) - Young warder
 The Day the Earth Caught Fire (1961) - Peter Stenning
 Mystery Submarine (1963) - Lt. Cmdr. Tarlton
 Stolen Hours (1963) - Mike Bannerman
 The World Ten Times Over (1963) - Bob Shelbourne
 The Long Ships (1964) - Sven
 First Men in the Moon (1964) - Bedford / Arnold Bedford
 Strange Bedfellows (1965) - Harry Jones
 Invasion (1966) - Dr. Mike Vernon
 Island of Terror (1966) - Dr. David West
 The Vengeance of She (1968) - Philip
 Living Free (1972) - Game Warden Weaver
 Universal Soldier (1972) - Rawlings
 Because of the Cats (1973) - Mierle
 The Vault of Horror (1973) - Alex (segment 4 "Bargain in Death")
 O Lucky Man! (1973) - Oswald
 Assassin (1973) - MI5 Control
 Feelings (1976) - Dr. Benson
 Thriller (1975) Episode: "Murder Motel" - Charles Burns
 Spanish Fly (1976) - Perkins (voice)
 The Incredible Sarah (1976) - Jarrett
 The New Avengers "To catch a rat" (1976) - Cromwell
 Flambards (1979) - Uncle Russell
 The Boys in Blue (1982) - John Hilling
 Night Train To Murder (1983) - Knife Thrower
 The Hound of the Baskervilles (1983) - Barrymore
 The Kitchen Toto (1987) - Dick Luis
 Jack the Ripper (1988) - DCS Arnold

Television

References

External links 
 
 Obituary in The Independent
 Obituary in The Guardian

1932 births
2009 deaths
British male television actors
British male film actors
British male voice actors
British people of Russian descent
Male actors from Shanghai